The Jennifer Cramblett incident took place in Ohio, United States in 2014, when Jennifer Cramblett, a white woman in a lesbian relationship, gave birth to a multiracial female child.  Cramblett had requested a sperm donor from a white man and instead was impregnated by the sperm donated by an African American man.

The incident made national headlines and Cramblett and her domestic partner Amanda Zinkon filed a lawsuit against the sperm bank which they eventually lost.

In the lawsuit Cramblett said the incident was "an unplanned transracial parent-child relationship for which she was not, and is not, prepared."

Cramblett also claimed the lawsuit was "not about race".

References

External links

2014 controversies
2014 in the United States
LGBT history in the United States
Race in the United States
Sperm donation
African-American people
Lesbian history in the United States
White Americans
2014 in LGBT history